Podbrezová is a large village and municipality in Brezno District, in the Banská Bystrica Region of central Slovakia, around 10 km west of the district seat town, Brezno.

History
The village is actually made of six former independent settlements, which were grouped in the 19th century around a new mill - the Hron iron works.

Sport

Football
Podbrezová has a football club FO ŽP Šport Podbrezová which currently plays in the Fortuna Liga. In the 2013–2014 season, Podbrezová finished first in this league and will therefore promote to the highest Slovak league, the Slovak Super Liga for the 2014–2015 season. This is the first time in the club's existence that they will play in this league. Home games are played in the ZELPO Arena, located in Podbrezová.

References

External links
 Municipal website 

Villages and municipalities in Brezno District